Alberto Spagnoli (born 2 October 1994) is an Italian professional footballer who plays as a forward for  club Ancona.

Club career
On 1 July 2021 he joined to Serie C club Feralpisalò, after two seasons on Modena.

On 5 July 2022, Spagnoli moved to Ancona-Matelica.

References

External links 
 
 

1994 births
Living people
People from Pordenone
Footballers from Friuli Venezia Giulia
Italian footballers
Association football forwards
Serie C players
Serie D players
A.C. Milan players
Hellas Verona F.C. players
A.S.D. Sacilese Calcio players
F.C. Südtirol players
A.C. Mestre players
A.C. Renate players
Modena F.C. 2018 players
FeralpiSalò players
Ancona-Matelica players